Semaphorin 3E is a protein that in humans is encoded by the SEMA3E gene.

Function

Semaphorin are a large family of conserved secreted and membrane associated proteins which possess a semaphorin (Sema) domain and a PSI domain (found in plexins, semaphorins and integrins) in the N-terminal extracellular portion. Based on sequence and structural similarities, semaphorins are put into eight classes: invertebrates contain classes 1 and 2, viruses have class V, and vertebrates contain classes 3-7. Semaphorins serve as axon guidance ligands via multimeric receptor complexes, some (if not all) containing plexin proteins. 

This gene encodes a class 3 semaphorin. Multiple transcript variants encoding different isoforms have been found for this gene.[provided by RefSeq, May 2010].

References

Further reading